Krachi Nchumuru is one of the constituencies represented in the Parliament of Ghana. It elects one Member of Parliament (MP) by the first past the post system of election. Krachi Nchumuru is located in the Krachi Nchumuru district of the Oti Region of Ghana.

Boundaries
The constituency was originally located within the Volta Region of Ghana until new Regions were created following the December 2018 referendum.

Members of Parliament

Elections

References 

Parliamentary constituencies in the Oti Region